Zeferino Paulo Borges Soares (born 27 August 1978), known simply as Zeferino, is a Portuguese retired footballer who played as a striker.

Football career
Zeferino was born in Bissau, Guinea-Bissau. Aged 17, he was bought by Real Madrid from F.C. Porto, but never played for the first team, going on to appear three seasons for the reserve side Real Madrid Castilla while also serving two second division loans in Spain.
 
In January 2001 Zeferino was released and joined F.C. Alverca, going on to experience his most steady period, with three consecutive top level seasons. Prior to the 2005–06 kick-off he had a trial with Major League Soccer's D.C. United, but nothing came of it, and he went on to represent Umm-Salal Sports Club (twice), CD Logroñés, Çetinkaya Türk S.K. and Hibernians FC.

References

External links

KTFF profile

1978 births
Living people
Sportspeople from Bissau
Portuguese sportspeople of Bissau-Guinean descent
Naturalised citizens of Portugal
Bissau-Guinean footballers
Portuguese footballers
Association football forwards
Primeira Liga players
Liga Portugal 2 players
F.C. Alverca players
Segunda División players
Segunda División B players
Tercera División players
Real Madrid Castilla footballers
UD Las Palmas players
CD Badajoz players
CD Logroñés footballers
Qatar Stars League players
Umm Salal SC players
Çetinkaya Türk S.K. players
Maltese Premier League players
Hibernians F.C. players
Portugal youth international footballers
Portugal under-21 international footballers
Bissau-Guinean expatriate footballers
Portuguese expatriate footballers
Expatriate footballers in Portugal
Expatriate footballers in Spain
Expatriate footballers in Qatar
Expatriate footballers in Northern Cyprus
Expatriate footballers in Malta
Portuguese expatriate sportspeople in Spain
Portuguese expatriate sportspeople in Qatar